Gariwal is a village in the Punjab province of  Pakistan. It is located at 31°4'0N 72°53'0E with an altitude of 171 metres (564 feet). Neighbouring settlements include Nara Dada and Rashiana.

References

Populated places in Toba Tek Singh District